Hibbertia sulcinervis is a species of flowering plant in the family Dilleniaceae and is endemic to the central coast of New South Wales. It is an erect shrub with linear leaves and yellow flowers with six or seven stamens grouped beside two carpels.

Description
Flowering occurs from September to December.

Taxonomy
Hibbertia sulcinervis was first formally described in 2012 by Hellmut R. Toelken in the Journal of the Adelaide Botanic Gardens from specimens collected by Roger Coveny near Nortons Basin in 1965. The specific epithet (sulcinervis) means "with grooved nerves", referring to the central leaf veins.

Distribution
This hibbertia is only known from two collections, the most recent in 1965 from Nortons Basin on the Nepean River, and it may now be extinct.

References

sulcinervis
Flora of New South Wales
Plants described in 2012
Taxa named by Hellmut R. Toelken